"Yabba" is the nickname of Stephen Gascoigne (1878–1942), a well-known heckler at the Sydney Cricket Ground.

Yabba may also refer to:

A shortening of "Yabba-Dabba-Doo!", a phrase from the animated television series The Flintstones
Yabba, an English word of  Australian Aboriginal origin meaning "to talk"
Yaba (drug), a Thai drug containing methamphetamine and caffeine
"The Yabba", an instrumental track by Battles
Tillandsia 'Yabba', a hybrid cultivar of the genus Tillandsia in the Bromeliad family
The Yabba, short for Bundanyabba, a fictional mining town in the 1971 film Wake in Fright 
"Yabba, Yabba, Yabba", a Shining Time Station Season 2 episode

See also
 Yabba Falls and Yabba Creek, Queensland, Australia
Yabba Dabba Doo (disambiguation)